Harold and Maude is a 1971 American romantic black comedy–drama film directed by Hal Ashby and released by Paramount Pictures. It incorporates elements of dark humor and existentialist drama. The plot follows the exploits of Harold Chasen (Bud Cort), a young man who is intrigued with death, and who rejects the life his detached mother (Vivian Pickles) prescribes for him. Harold develops a friendship, and eventual romantic relationship, with 79-year-old Maude (Ruth Gordon) who teaches Harold about the importance of living life to its fullest.

The screenplay by Colin Higgins began as his master's thesis for film school. Filming locations in the San Francisco Bay Area included both Holy Cross Cemetery and Golden Gate National Cemetery, the ruins of the Sutro Baths and Rose Court Mansion in Hillsborough, California.

Critically and commercially unsuccessful when first released, the film eventually developed a cult following, and first made a profit in 1983. The film was selected for preservation in the National Film Registry in 1997, and was ranked number 45 on the American Film Institute list of 100 funniest movies of all time in 2000. The Criterion Collection released a special edition Blu-ray and DVD in 2012.

Plot
Harold Chasen is a 19-year-old man obsessed with death. He stages elaborate fake suicides, attends funerals (usually for people that he doesn't know), and drives a hearse, all to the chagrin of his self-obsessed, wealthy socialite mother. His mother sends Harold to a psychoanalyst, sets him up with blind dates, and buys him a luxury car, all schemes he subverts in his own way.

Harold meets 79-year-old Maude one day while at a random stranger's funeral Mass, and discovers that they share a hobby. Harold is entranced by Maude's quirky outlook on life, which is bright and delightfully carefree in contrast with his moribund demeanor. Maude lives in a decommissioned railroad car and thinks nothing of breaking the law; she is quite skilled at stealing cars and will swiftly uproot an ailing tree on public property to re-plant it in the forest. She and Harold form a bond and Maude shows Harold the pleasures of art and music (including how to play banjo), and teaches him how to make "the most of his time on earth." Meanwhile, Harold's mother is determined, against Harold's wishes, to find him a wife. One by one, Harold frightens and horrifies each of his appointed computer dates, by appearing to commit gruesome acts: self-immolation, self-mutilation, and seppuku. His mother tries enlisting him in the military by sending Harold to his uncle, who lost an arm serving under General MacArthur in the Second World War, but Harold deters the recruitment by staging a scene where Maude poses as a pacifist protester and Harold seemingly murders her out of militarist fanaticism.

As Harold and Maude grow closer, their friendship blossoms into a romance. Holding her hand, Harold discovers a number tattooed on her forearm, indicating Maude survived the Nazi death camps. Harold announces that he will marry Maude, resulting in disgusted outbursts from his family, analyst, and priest. Unbeknownst to  Harold, Maude has been planning to commit suicide on her eightieth birthday. Maude's birthday arrives, and Harold throws a surprise party for her. As the pair dance, Maude tells Harold that she "couldn't imagine a lovelier farewell." When Maude reveals that she has taken an overdose of sleeping pills, and will be dead by midnight, Harold rushes Maude to the hospital. After learning of Maude's death, Harold is shown speeding down a country road, and sending the car off a seaside cliff. After the crash, the final shot reveals Harold standing calmly atop the cliff, holding his banjo and wearing colorful clothing for the first time in the film. After gazing down at the wreckage, he dances away to "If You Want to Sing Out, Sing Out".

Cast
Ruth Gordon as Dame Marjorie "Maude" Chardin, a 79-year-old free spirit. Maude believes in living each day to the fullest, and "trying something new every day". Her view of life is so joyful that, true to the film's motif, it crosses a blurred, shifting line into a carefree attitude toward death as well. We know little of her past, but learn that as a young woman she was a radical suffragette who fought off police constables with her umbrella, was once married, lived in pre-war Vienna, and has a Nazi concentration camp tattoo on her arm.
Bud Cort as Harold Parker Chasen, a young man who is obsessed with death. He drives a hearse, attends funerals of strangers and stages elaborate fake suicides. Through meeting and falling in love with Maude, he discovers joy in living for the first time.
Vivian Pickles as Mrs. Chasen, Harold's opulently wealthy mother, is controlling, snooty and seemingly incapable of affection. Hoping to force him into respectability, Mrs. Chasen replaces Harold's beloved hearse with a Jaguar (which he then converts to a miniature hearse), and sets up several blind dates (more accurately, "bride interviews") for her son.
Cyril Cusack as Glaucus, the sculptor who makes an ice statue of Maude and lends them his tools to transport a tree.
Charles Tyner as General Victor Ball, Harold's uncle who lost an arm in the war and now pulls a hidden cord to make his wire prosthetic "salute". At Mrs. Chasen's request, he attempts to prepare Harold to join the armed forces. The effort is thwarted by a planned stunt in which Harold appears to "kill" Maude.
Eric Christmas as the Priest.
George Wood as Harold's psychiatrist.
Ellen Geer as Sunshine Doré, an actress, Harold's third blind date. She is one of the few arranged dates who take part in mimicking Harold's suicides, giving a histrionic rendition of Juliet's death scene.
Judy Engles as Candy Gulf, Harold's first blind date, whom he scares off by apparently setting himself on fire.
Shari Summers as Edith Phern, Harold's second blind date, whom he dissuades by pretending to cut off his hand.
Tom Skerritt (credited as "M. Borman") as the Motorcycle Officer who stops Maude and Harold.
Director Hal Ashby appears in an uncredited cameo, seen at a penny arcade watching a model train at the Santa Cruz Beach Boardwalk.

Production
UCLA film school student Colin Higgins wrote Harold and Maude as his master's thesis. While working as producer Edward Lewis's pool boy, Higgins showed the script to Lewis's wife, Mildred. Mildred was so impressed that she got Edward to give it to Stanley Jaffe at Paramount. Higgins sold the script with the understanding that he would direct the film but he was told he wasn't ready, after tests he shot proved unsatisfactory to the studio heads. Ashby would only commit to directing the film after getting Higgins' blessing and then, so Higgins could watch and learn from him on the set, Ashby made Higgins a co-producer. Higgins says he originally thought of the story as a play. It then became a 20-minute thesis while at film school. The film script was turned into a novel and then a play, which ran for several years in Paris.

Ashby felt that the actress portraying Maude should ideally be European and his list of possible actresses included dames Peggy Ashcroft, Edith Evans, Gladys Cooper, and Celia Johnson as well as Lotte Lenya, Luise Rainer, Pola Negri, Minta Durfee, and Agatha Christie. Ruth Gordon indicated that in addition she heard that Edwige Feuillère, Elisabeth Bergner, Mildred Natwick, Mildred Dunnock, and Dorothy Stickney had been considered.

For Harold, in addition to Bud Cort, Ashby considered all promising unknowns, Richard Dreyfuss, Bob Balaban, and John Savage. Also on his list were John Rubinstein, for whom Higgins had written the part, and then-up-and-coming British pop star Elton John, whom Ashby had seen live and hoped would also do the music.

Anne Brebner, the casting director, was almost cast as Harold's mother, when Vivian Pickles was briefly unable to do the role.

Novelization
A novelization by Higgins was released alongside the film; they differ in several respects, including the film's omission of certain scenes and characters. Other different details include the novel's version of Maude having white hair (unlike Ruth Gordon in the film) and introducing herself as "the Countess Mathilde Chardin," a different name and title than used in the film. In the novel, Maude's home is characterized as a "cottage" (unlike the retired railroad car Maude inhabits in the movie), and she and Harold briefly interact with Maude's neighbor, Madame Arouet, who is not present in the film. The novel includes an additional scene during the tree-planting expedition where Maude leads Harold in climbing to the top of a very tall pine tree to show him the view over the forest from near its summit.

Release
Harold and Maude was released with a vague, text-only poster and very little marketing. The initial release was a box-office flop, but it gradually found success in repertory theatres and recouped its costs after several years. According to Danny Peary, author of the Cult Movies series: "The film was a runaway cult favorite, and, most memorably, in Minneapolis, residents actually picketed the Westgate Theater, and tried to get the management to replace the picture after a consecutive three-year run."

Critical response
Harold and Maude received mixed reviews, with several critics being offended by the film's dark humor. Roger Ebert, in a review dated January 1, 1972, gave the film one-and-a-half out of four stars. He wrote, "And so what we get, finally, is a movie of attitudes. Harold is death, Maude life, and they manage to make the two seem so similar that life's hardly worth the extra bother. The visual style makes everyone look fresh from the Wax Museum, and all the movie lacks is a lot of day-old gardenias and lilies and roses in the lobby, filling the place with a cloying sweet smell. Nothing more to report today. Harold doesn't even make pallbearer." Vincent Canby also panned the film, stating that the actors "are so aggressive, so creepy and off-putting, that Harold and Maude are obviously made for each other, a point the movie itself refuses to recognize with a twist ending that betrays, I think, its life-affirming pretensions."

The reputation of the film has increased greatly; Rotten Tomatoes, which labeled the film as "Certified Fresh", gave it a score of 85% based on 46 reviews, with an average score of 7.80/10. A consensus on the site read, "Hal Ashby's comedy is too dark and twisted for some, and occasionally oversteps its bounds, but there's no denying the film's warm humor and big heart."  In 2005, the Writers Guild of America ranked the screenplay #86 on its list of 101 Greatest Screenplays ever written. Sight & Sound magazine conducts a poll every ten years of the world's finest film directors, to find out the Ten Greatest Films of All Time. This poll has been going since 1992 and has become the most recognized poll of its kind in the world. In 2012, Niki Caro, Wanuri Kahiu, and Cyrus Frisch voted for Harold and Maude. Frisch commented: "An encouragement to think beyond the obvious!" In 2017, Chicago Tribune critic Mark Caro wrote a belated appreciation, "I'm sorry, Harold and Maude, for denying you for so long. You're my favorite movie once again."

Home media
The Criterion Collection released Harold and Maude for Region 1 on DVD and Blu-ray on June 12, 2012, including a collection of audio excerpts of director Hal Ashby from January 11, 1972 and of screenwriter Colin Higgins from January 10, 1979, a new video interview with Yusuf/Cat Stevens, a new audio commentary by Ashby biographer Nick Dawson and producer Charles B. Mulvehill, and a booklet which includes a new film essay by Matt Zoller Seitz. Exclusive to the Blu-ray edition are a new digital restoration of the film with an uncompressed monaural soundtrack and an optional remastered uncompressed stereo soundtrack. Other exclusives are a New York Times profile of actress Ruth Gordon from 1971, an interview from 1997 with actor Bud Cort and cinematographer John Alonzo, and an interview from 2001 with executive producer Mildred Lewis.

Accolades

At the 29th Golden Globe Awards, Bud Cort and Ruth Gordon were nominated as Best Actor and Best Actress in a Musical or Comedy film, respectively.

The film was selected for preservation in the National Film Registry in 1997, along with others deemed "culturally, historically or aesthetically significant" by the Library of Congress.

Harold and Maude has repeatedly been ranked among the various lists compiled by the American Film Institute.  In 2000 the film ranked #45 on the list of 100 Years... 100 Laughs, the top hundred comedies. Two years later Harold and Maude ranked #69 on the AFI list 100 Years... 100 Passions, honoring the most romantic films of the past century. In 2006 the film ranked #89 on the AFI list 100 Years...100 Cheers, recognizing the most inspiring movies. In June 2008 AFI revealed its 10 Top 10: the best ten films in ten "classic" American film genres, placing Harold and Maude at #9 in the romantic comedy genre.

In September 2008 Empire ranked Harold and Maude #65 among their 500 Greatest Movies of All Time. Entertainment Weekly ranked the film #4 on their list of "The Top 50 Cult Films."

Music

The music in Harold and Maude was composed and performed by Cat Stevens. He had been suggested by Elton John to do the music after John had dropped out of the project. Stevens composed two original songs for the film, "Don't Be Shy" and "If You Want to Sing Out, Sing Out" and performed instrumental and alternative versions of the previously released songs "On the Road to Find Out", "I Wish, I Wish", "Miles from Nowhere", "Tea for the Tillerman", "I Think I See the Light", "Where Do the Children Play?" and "Trouble" (all from his albums Mona Bone Jakon or Tea for the Tillerman). "Don't Be Shy" and "If You Want to Sing Out, Sing Out" remained unreleased on any album until the 1984 compilation Footsteps in the Dark: Greatest Hits, Vol. 2.

Additional music in the film is sourced from well known compositions. "Greensleeves" is played on the harp during dinner. The opening bars of Tchaikovsky's Piano Concerto No. 1 are heard during the scene of Harold floating face-down in the swimming pool. The Sunnyvale HS Marching Band plays "The Klaxon" by Henry Fillmore outside the church following a funeral. A calliope version of the waltz "Over the Waves" by Juventino Rosas is played at the amusement park.  Harold and Maude waltz together in her home to "The Blue Danube" by Johann Strauss II.

The soundtrack album charted at number 173 on the US Billboard 200 in July 2021.

1972 soundtrack
The first soundtrack was released in Japan in 1972 on vinyl and cassette (A&M Records GP-216). It omitted the two original songs and all instrumental and alternative versions of songs and was generally composed of re-released material that was in the film, along with five songs that were not in the film.

Track listing
Side one
 "Morning Has Broken" (not in the film)
 "Wild World" (not in the film)
 "I Think I See the Light"
 "I Wish, I Wish"
 "Trouble"
 "Father and Son" (not in the film)
Side two
 "Miles from Nowhere"
 "Lilywhite" (not in the film)
 "Where Do the Children Play?"
 "On the Road to Find Out"
 "Lady D'Arbanville" (not in the film)
 "Tea for the Tillerman"

2007 soundtrack
The second soundtrack was released in December 2007, by Vinyl Films Records, as a vinyl-only limited-edition release of 2,500 copies. It contained a 30-page oral history of the making of the film, comprising the most extensive series of interviews yet conducted on Harold and Maude.
Track listing

Side one
 "Don't Be Shy"
 "On the Road to Find Out"
 "I Wish, I Wish"
 "Miles from Nowhere"
 "Tea for the Tillerman"
 "I Think I See the Light"
Side two
 "Where Do the Children Play?"
 "If You Want to Sing Out, Sing Out"
 "If You Want to Sing Out, Sing Out (banjo version)"—previously unreleased
 "Trouble"
 "Don't Be Shy (alternate version)"—previously unreleased
 "If You Want to Sing Out, Sing Out (instrumental version)"—previously unreleased
Bonus 7" single
 "Don't Be Shy (demo version)"—previously unreleased
 "If You Want to Sing Out, Sing Out (alternative version)"—previously unreleased

2021 soundtrack
A Record Store Day limited edition, available in yellow or orange vinyl, was released July 2021. It contained all the main songs from the 2007 album, but omitted the bonus material.

Side one
 Don't Be Shy	
 On The Road To Find Out	
 I Wish, I Wish	
 Miles From Nowhere	
Side two
 Tea For The Tillerman	
 I Think I See The Light	
 Where Do The Children Play?	
 If You Want To Sing Out, Sing Out	
 Trouble

2022 soundtrack
The full soundtrack album received its first regular wide commercial release on February 11, 2022, to commemorate the film's 50th Anniversary. The entire album was remastered at Abbey Road Studios. The disc includes previously unheard audio masters discovered in the Island Records/A&M archive for the two original songs Stevens wrote for the film, "Don't Be Shy" and "If You Want To Sing Out, Sing Out." While there was an LP, this was also the album's first-ever release on CD.

Side one
 "Don't Be Shy"
 Dialogue 1 (I Go To Funerals) 
 "On the Road to Find Out"
 "I Wish, I Wish"
 Tchaikovsky's Concerto No.1 in B        
 Dialogue 2 (How Many Suicides)          
 Marching Band / Dialogue 3 (Harold Meets Maude)    
 "Miles from Nowhere"
 "Tea for the Tillerman"
Side two
 "I Think I See the Light"
 Dialogue 4 (Sunflower)         
 "Where Do the Children Play?"
 "If You Want To Sing Out, Sing Out" (Ruth Gordon and Bud Cort vocal)  
 Strauss' Blue Danube
 Dialogue 5 (Somersaults)      
 "If You Want to Sing Out, Sing Out"
 Dialogue 6 (Harold Loves Maude)        
 "Trouble"
 "If You Want to Sing Out, Sing Out (ending)

Adaptations
Colin Higgins later adapted the story into a stage play. The original Broadway production, starring Janet Gaynor as Maude and Keith McDermott as Harold, closed after four performances in February 1980. The Yugoslav premiere of the play was staged at the Belgrade Drama Theatre (BDP) on March 23, 1980, two months after its performance on Broadway. Directed by Paolo Magelli, the main roles were played by Tatjana Lukjanova (Maude), Milan Erak (Harold), and Žiža Stojanović (Mrs. Chasen). After Milan Erak's passing, the role of Harold was taken over by Slobodan Beštić. The play was on the BDP repertoire until 2003 when Tatjana Lukjanova passed away.

A French adaptation for television, translated and written by Jean-Claude Carrière, appeared in 1978. It was also adapted for the stage by the Compagnie Viola Léger in Moncton, New Brunswick, starring Roy Dupuis.

A musical adaptation, with songs by Joseph Thalken and Tom Jones, premiered at the Paper Mill Playhouse in Millburn, NJ, in January 2005. The production starred Estelle Parsons as Maude and Eric Millegan as Harold.

Unproduced sequel and prequel
Higgins expressed interest in 1978 about both a sequel and prequel to Harold and Maude. The sequel, Harold's Story, would have Cort portray Harold's life after Maude. Higgins also imagined a prequel showing Maude's life before Harold, Grover and Maude had Maude learning how to steal cars from Grover Muldoon, the character portrayed by Richard Pryor in Higgins' 1976 film Silver Streak.  Higgins wanted Gordon and Pryor to reprise their respective roles.

See also
 List of American films of 1971

References

External links
 A Boy of Twenty and a Woman of Eighty an essay by Leticia Kent at the Criterion Collection

 
 
 
 
 
 
 Guide to Harold and Maude filming locations
 Harold and Maude essay by Daniel Eagan in America's Film Legacy: The Authoritative Guide to the Landmark Movies in the National Film Registry, A&C Black, 2010 , pages 677-679 

1971 films
1971 comedy-drama films
1970s black comedy films
1970s buddy comedy-drama films
1970s English-language films
1970s romantic comedy-drama films
American black comedy films
American buddy comedy-drama films
American romantic comedy-drama films
Cat Stevens
Films about couples
Films about old age
Films about suicide
Films directed by Hal Ashby
Films set in country houses
Films set in San Francisco
Films set in the San Francisco Bay Area
Films shot in San Francisco
Films with screenplays by Colin Higgins
Paramount Pictures films
United States National Film Registry films
Vinyl Films albums
Ageing in fiction
Ageism in fiction
1970s American films